, sometimes written as , is an Ainu ceremony in which a brown bear is sacrificed. The word literally means "to send something/someone off". In some Ainu villages, it is a Blakiston's fish owl, rather than a bear, that is the subject of the ceremony. In the modern day, the ceremony no longer involves the killing of an animal, but is performed for wild animals that die in accidents or captive animals that die of old age.

Practice

Trappers set out to the bear caves at the end of winter, while the bears are still in a state of torpor. If they find a newborn cub, they kill the mother and take the cub back to the village, where they raise it indoors, as if it were one of their own children. It is said that they even provide the cub with their own breast milk. When the cub grows larger, they take it outdoors, and put it into a small pen made of logs. Throughout their lives, the bears are provided with high-quality food. The cubs are treated as, and traditionally believed to be, gods.

After the cub reaches one or two years of age, they release it from the cell and place it in the center of the village, where it is tied to a post with a rope. The males in the village then take shots at the cub with bows and arrows. Even at the age of two years, the brown bears are quite large, and it usually takes numerous shots before they fall.  After the bear has been weakened from numerous arrow strikes and is too weak to defend itself, one villager will approach the bear and shoot it in the neck point-blank, to ensure that it is dead. The villagers then slit the bear's throat and drink the blood. The bear is skinned, and the meat is distributed amongst the villagers. Its bare skull is placed on a spear, which is then rewrapped with the bear's own fur. This "doll" is  an object of worship for the villagers. The bear has now been "sent off" to the world of the gods.

Legality
Hokkaido encouraged local governments to abolish the Iomante in 1955, but the circular notice was abolished in April 2007, because the Ministry of the Environment of Japan announced that animal ceremonies were generally regarded as an exception of the animal rights law of Japan in October 2006.

Museum displays
Iomante videos and artifacts are on display at the Nibutani Ainu Culture Museum in Nibutani, Hokkaidō, as well as the Ainu Museum in Shiraoi-cho, Hokkaidō.

See also 
Peijaiset, a bear sacrifice ritual of Finland.
Clan of the Cave Bear, a novel about a prehistoric society centred around a similar sacrifice.
Bear worship

References

Some of the content of this article was taken from the equivalent Japanese-language Wikipedia article (accessed April 10, 2006).

Ainu culture
Animal sacrifice
Bears in religion